Strangford (from Old Norse Strangr fjörðr, meaning "strong sea-inlet") is a small village at the mouth of Strangford Lough, on the Lecale peninsula in County Down, Northern Ireland. It had a population of 475 at the 2001 Census.

On the other side of the lough is Portaferry on the Ards Peninsula, and there is a ferry service between the two villages. The village has a small harbour, which is overlooked by rows of 19th-century cottages and a fine Georgian terrace.

Places of interest
Strangford Castle, near the harbour in Strangford, is a 16th-century tower house with a drop hole at roof level to defend the door.
Castle Ward consists of a 16th century tower house and an 18th century mansion built in two distinct architectural styles, Classical and Gothic, overlooking Strangford Lough. The property is owned by the National Trust. Castle Ward is one-and-one-half miles from Strangford.
Audley's Castle is a 15th-century castle one mile northeast of Strangford, overlooking Strangford Lough.
Audleystown Court Tomb is a Neolithic dual court tomb almost two miles northwest of Strangford.

Gallery

References

Ports and harbours of Northern Ireland
Villages in County Down
Port cities and towns in Northern Ireland